Løten Church is a parish church of the Church of Norway in Løten Municipality in Innlandet county, Norway. It is located in the village of Løten. It is the main church for the Løten parish which is part of the Hamar domprosti (deanery) in the Diocese of Hamar. The white, stone church was built in a long church design around the year 1200 using plans drawn up by an unknown architect. The church seats about 400 people.

History
The church in Løten was built of stone around the year 1200 with a number of Romanesque features. Originally, the church probably did not have a tower. Later, a small tower on the roof of the nave was added.

In 1814, this church served as an election church. Together with more than 300 other parish churches across Norway, it was a polling station for elections to the 1814 Norwegian Constituent Assembly which wrote the Constitution of Norway. This was Norway's first national elections. Each church parish was a constituency that elected people called "electors" who later met together in each county to elect the representatives for the assembly that was to meet in Eidsvoll later that year.

During the 19th century, a time marked by population growth and regulations that required a certain proportion of the congregation to have a place in the church, the church was enlarged. From 1872-1873, the nave was doubled in size by adding on to the west. Also, a new church porch and tower were built on the west end of the newly enlarged nave with all new windows. A new pulpit and altarpiece were also put in the church during this time. This construction project was designed by the architect Otto Schønheyder and Herman Frang was the lead builder.  During the 1950s, the sacristy was built adjacent to the choir. The church was externally restored in 1989–1990 with an interior refurbishment in 1995.

Media gallery

See also
List of churches in Hamar

References

Further reading

External links
 

Løten
Churches in Innlandet
Long churches in Norway
Stone churches in Norway
12th-century churches in Norway
12th-century establishments in Norway
Norwegian election church